The Cupola House is a historic house located in Egg Harbor, Wisconsin. It was added to the National Register of Historic Places in 1979.

History
The house was built by Levi Thorp. Thorp paid for it with gold he acquired during the California Gold Rush. The building now houses an art gallery, a cafe and a shop.

References

Houses on the National Register of Historic Places in Wisconsin
Art museums and galleries in Wisconsin
Houses completed in 1871
Houses in Door County, Wisconsin
National Register of Historic Places in Door County, Wisconsin
Italianate architecture in Wisconsin
Victorian architecture in Wisconsin